The following is an alphabetical list of topics related to the French territorial collectivity of Saint Pierre and Miquelon.

0–9

.pm – Internet country code top-level domain for Saint Pierre and Miquelon

A
Air Saint-Pierre
Airports in Saint Pierre and Miquelon
Americas
North America
Northern America
North Atlantic Ocean
Golfe du Saint-Laurent (Gulf of Saint Lawrence)
Cabot Strait
Islands of Saint Pierre and Miquelon
Archipelago Tomorrow
Atlantic Jet
Atlantic Ocean
Atlas of Saint-Pierre and Miquelon

B

C
Canada

Canada–France relations
Canada–France Maritime Boundary Case
Capital of Saint Pierre and Miquelon:  Saint-Pierre on Île Saint-Pierre
Categories:
:Category:Saint Pierre and Miquelon
:Category:Buildings and structures in Saint Pierre and Miquelon
:Category:Communications in Saint Pierre and Miquelon
:Category:Saint Pierre and Miquelon culture
:Category:Economy of Saint Pierre and Miquelon
:Category:Education in Saint Pierre and Miquelon
:Category:Environment of Saint Pierre and Miquelon
:Category:Geography of Saint Pierre and Miquelon
:Category:History of Saint Pierre and Miquelon
:Category:People from Saint Pierre and Miquelon
:Category:Politics of Saint Pierre and Miquelon
:Category:Saint Pierre and Miquelon-related lists
:Category:Society of Saint Pierre and Miquelon
:Category:Sport in Saint Pierre and Miquelon
:Category:Transport in Saint Pierre and Miquelon
commons:Category:Saint Pierre and Miquelon
Cities of Saint-Pierre and Miquelon
Coat of arms of Saint Pierre and Miquelon
Collectivité territoriale de Saint-Pierre-et-Miquelon (French territorial collectivity of Saint Pierre and Miquelon)
Communications in Saint Pierre and Miquelon

D
Demographics of Saint Pierre and Miquelon
La Dune

E
Economy of Saint Pierre and Miquelon
Elections in Saint Pierre and Miquelon

F

Flag of Canada

Flag of France
Flag of Saint Pierre and Miquelon
Franc
France
French America
French colonization of the Americas
French language
French Republic
French territorial collectivity of Saint Pierre and Miquelon (Collectivité territoriale de Saint-Pierre-et-Miquelon)
French Republic (République française)

G
Geography of Saint Pierre and Miquelon
Golfe du Saint-Laurent
Grand Barachois
Grand Colombier
Gross domestic product
Gulf of Saint Lawrence

H
History of Saint Pierre and Miquelon

I
International Organization for Standardization (ISO)
ISO 3166-1 alpha-2 country code for Saint Pierre and Miquelon: PM
ISO 3166-1 alpha-3 country code for Saint Pierre and Miquelon: SPM
Internet in Saint Pierre and Miquelon
Islands of Saint Pierre and Miquelon
Grand Colombier
Île de Langlade
Île de Miquelon
Île Saint-Pierre
L'Île-aux-Marins
L'Île-aux-Vainqueurs
La Dune

L
Lists related to Saint Pierre and Miquelon:
List of airports in Saint Pierre and Miquelon
List of cities in Saint-Pierre and Miquelon
List of countries by GDP (nominal)
List of islands of Saint Pierre and Miquelon
List of mammals in Saint Pierre and Miquelon
List of people from Saint Pierre et Miquelon
List of political parties in Saint Pierre and Miquelon
List of rivers of Saint Pierre and Miquelon
List of Saint Pierre and Miquelon-related topics
Topic outline of Saint Pierre and Miquelon
Langlade Island
L'Île-aux-Marins

M
Mammals of Saint Pierre and Miquelon
Miquelon Airport
Miquelon-Langlade
Miquelon Island
Miquelon, Miquelon-Langlade
Municipal governments in Saint Pierre and Miquelon

N
Newfoundland and Labrador, Saint Pierre and Miquelon's neighbour
Eugène Nicole
North America
North Atlantic Ocean
Northern America
Northern Hemisphere

P
Pointe aux Cannon Battery
Political parties in Saint Pierre and Miquelon
Politics of Saint Pierre and Miquelon
Postage stamps and postal history of St. Pierre and Miquelon
Prefect of Saint Pierre and Miquelon

R
République française (French Republic)
Rivers of Saint Pierre and Miquelon
Roman Catholic Vicariate Apostolic of Iles Saint Pierre and Miquelon

S
Saint-Pierre on Île Saint-Pierre – Capital of Saint Pierre and Miquelon
Saint-Pierre Airport
Saint Pierre and Miquelon (Saint-Pierre-et-Miquelon)
Saint Pierre and Miquelon national football team
Saint-Pierre Cathedral
Saint Pierre Island
Saint-Pierre-et-Miquelon's 1st constituency
Scouting in Saint Pierre and Miquelon
Stade John Girardin

T
Territorial Council of Saint Pierre and Miquelon
Topic outline of Saint Pierre and Miquelon
Transportation in Saint Pierre and Miquelon

W
Western Hemisphere
The Widow of Saint-Pierre

Wikipedia:WikiProject Topic outline/Drafts/Topic outline of Saint Pierre and Miquelon

See also

List of international rankings
Lists of country-related topics
Topic outline of geography
Topic outline of North America
Topic outline of Saint Pierre and Miquelon

References

External links

 
Saint Pierre and Miquelon